The Cross-State Air Pollution Rule (CSAPR) is a rule by the United States Environmental Protection Agency (EPA) that requires member states of the United States to reduce power plant emissions that contribute to ozone and/or fine particle pollution in other states. The EPA describes this rule as one that "protects the health of millions of Americans by helping states reduce air pollution and attain clean air standards."

Details
The CSAPR requires 23 United States states to reduce their annual emissions of sulfur dioxide (SO2) and nitrogen oxides (NOx) to help downwind states attain the 24-hour National Ambient Air Quality Standards, and 25 states to reduce ozone season nitrogen oxide emissions to help downwind states attain the 8-hour NAAQS.

The states that are required to reduce sulfur dioxide emissions are divided into two groups, both of which must reduce their emissions in 2012. Group 1 is required to make additional emissions reductions by 2014.

History

Reception
The CSAPR has been defended by environmental groups such as the Environmental Defense Fund, progressive think tanks such as ThinkProgress, and publications such as the Huffington Post.

References

External links
 Official ruling

Air pollution in the United States
United States federal environmental legislation